"Firestarter" is a song by British band the Prodigy, released on 18 March 1996 as the first single from their third album, The Fat of the Land (1997). It was their tenth single overall and is the group's first number-one single on the UK Singles Chart, staying on top for three weeks, and their first big international hit, topping the charts in the Czech Republic, Finland, Hungary, and Norway. In 2020, British newspaper The Guardian ranked the song number eight on their list of "The 100 Greatest UK No 1 Singles".

Composition
The songwriting credits include Kim Deal of alternative rock group the Breeders, as the looped wah-wah guitar riff in "Firestarter" was sampled from the Breeders' track "S.O.S." from the album Last Splash. The drums are sampled from a remix of the song "Devotion" of the group Ten City. The "hey" sample is from the 1984 song "Close (to the Edit)" by Art of Noise. Then-members Anne Dudley, Trevor Horn, J. J. Jeczalik, Gary Langan and Paul Morley also receive songwriting credits. The "Empirion Mix", which does not include these samples, is credited solely to Liam Howlett and Keith Flint.

Critical reception
British magazine Music Week rated "Firestarter" five out of five, picking it as Single of the Week. The reviewer added, "Powerful return for the kings of live techno." Brad Beatnik from the magazine's RM Dance Update described it as "a typically searing chunk of heavy techno featuring some manie vocale and an awesome synth line". He concluded, "Straight in the Top 10, no question, and destined to be pounded in the clubs." Gerald Martinez from New Sunday Times noted its "heavy metal meets techno-dance stylisations". Writing for pitchfork.com in 2005, Jess Harvell said, "'Firestarter' sounds like Trent Reznor in one of his all-too-rare moments of self-aware humor, like the Bomb Squad at +5 with a pink-haired British bulldog bellowing about how tuff he is." David Sinclair from The Times noted, "A racing, twitchy, all-hands-on-deck rhythmic pulse, with a first beat in the bar that lands like a bodyblow, it is spiced up by a siren-wail synth sound and various shrieks that resemble an Art of Noise vocal sample."

Music video
The accompanying black-and-white music video for "Firestarter" was directed by English director Walter Stern and was filmed in an abandoned London Underground tunnel at Aldwych.

Impact and legacy
In October 2011, NME placed it at number 52 on its list "150 Best Tracks of the Past 15 Years". Following Flint's death on 4 March 2019, fans used the hashtag 'Firestarter4Number1' on various social media platforms to replicate the song's success by getting it to the number one spot again. This was done out of respect for Keith Flint and to raise awareness of suicide among men. During this time the single also returned to the Billboard charts, entering number 13 on its Dance/Electronic Digital Songs Sales chart in its 16 March 2019 issue, marking the first time that this song has appeared on a Billboard dance chart. In 2020, British newspaper The Guardian ranked "Firestarter" number eight on their list of "The 100 Greatest UK No 1 Singles". In 2022, Rolling Stone ranked it number 110 on their list of "200 Greatest Dance Songs of All Time".

Track listings

 UK and Australian CD single, US maxi-CD single
 "Firestarter" (edit) – 3:45
 "Firestarter" (Empirion mix) – 7:49
 "Firestarter" (instrumental) – 4:39
 "Molotov Bitch" – 4:51

 UK and US 12-inch single
A1. "Firestarter" – 4:40
A2. "Firestarter" (instrumental) – 4:39
B1. "Firestarter" (Empirion mix) – 7:49
B2. "Molotov Bitch" – 4:51

 UK cassette single
 "Firestarter" (edit) – 3:45
 "Molotov Bitch" – 4:51

 European CD single
 "Firestarter" (edit) – 3:45
 "Firestarter" (Empirion mix) – 7:49

 US CD single and cassette single
 "Firestarter" (edit)
 "Firestarter" (instrumental)

Charts

Weekly charts

Year-end charts

Certifications

Notable cover versions
"Weird Al" Yankovic created a loose parody of "Firestarter", titled "Lousy Haircut", for an episode of The Weird Al Show; he could not do a full parody of the song as the network CBS did not want to pay royalties to the Prodigy. The song has also been covered by Jimmy Eat World, Gene Simmons of KISS, Torre Florim of De Staat, Sepultura, Papa Roach, and Kristina Esfandiari under her project NGHTCRWLR.

References

External links
 

1995 songs
1996 singles
Black-and-white music videos
Maverick Records singles
Music videos directed by Walter Stern
Mute Records singles
Number-one singles in the Czech Republic
Number-one singles in Finland
Number-one singles in Hungary
Number-one singles in Norway
The Prodigy songs
Songs written by Anne Dudley
Songs written by Kim Deal
Songs written by Liam Howlett
Songs written by Trevor Horn
Techno songs
UK Singles Chart number-one singles
XL Recordings singles